Greatest Hits 1990–1999: A Tribute to a Work in Progress... is a compilation album by American rock band The Black Crowes, released June 20, 2000, by American Recordings & Columbia Records. It features material from all of their studio albums up to that point, and reached #143 on the Billboard 200.

Track listing

Personnel 
The Black Crowes

Jeff Cease – guitar 
Johnny Colt – bass guitar 
Marc Ford – guitar 
Steve Gorman – drums 
Eddie Harsch  – keyboards 
Sven Pipien – bass guitar 
Chris Robinson – vocals , blues harp 
 Rich Robinson – guitar 

Uncredited musicians

 Chuck Leavell – piano, organ 

Production

The Black Crowes – production 
 George Drakoulias – production 
 Jack Joseph Puig – production 
 Kevin Shirley – production 
Leon Zervos – mastering
Pete Angelus – personal management
James Diener & Mark Feldman – project management
 Josh Cheuse – art direction

Charts 
Weekly Charts

References

2000 greatest hits albums
The Black Crowes compilation albums
American Recordings (record label) compilation albums
Columbia Records compilation albums